George Stentiford (7 May 1900 – 1976) was an English footballer who played in the Football League for Stockport County and Stoke.

Career
Born in Brentford, Stentiford started his career with non-league Kingstonian in the Athenian League. He impressed at right half and he earned a move north to Football League side Huddersfield Town. Without making an appearance for the "Terriers", he joined Stoke and played eight matches during the 1923–24 season and three more in the following campaign before joining Stockport County in 1924. He spent two years at Edgeley Park and returned to the south with Guildford United.

Career statistics

References

1900 births
1976 deaths
People from Brentford
English footballers
Association football wing halves
Kingstonian F.C. players
Huddersfield Town A.F.C. players
Stoke City F.C. players
Stockport County F.C. players
Guildford City F.C. players
English Football League players